Nefertiti is an album by American jazz pianist Andrew Hill, recorded in 1976 and originally released on the Japanese East Wind label. The album features six of Hill's original compositions performed by a trio.

Reception

The Allmusic review by Scott Yanow awarded the album 4 stars and stated "although the music seems slightly more conservative than usual for a Hill set, the music is consistently stimulating".

Track listing
All compositions by Andrew Hill

 "Blue Black" - 14:10
 "Relativity" - 5:29
 "Nefertiti" - 8:08
 "Hattie" - 3:47
 "Mudflower" - 7:32
 "Unnatural Man" - 3:23

Personnel
Andrew Hill - piano
Richard Davis - bass
Roger Blank - drums

References

East Wind Records albums
Andrew Hill albums
1976 albums